Auchenrivock Tower is a ruined late 16th century tower house situated near Langholm, Dumfries and Galloway.  The remains of the tower, which rise 8 feet at their highest, are currently built into a garden wall.

An earlier stronghold of the Irvings of Eskdale, called Stakehugh, lay near the current site.

The place name Auchenrivock is derived from the Scottish Gaelic, Achadh Riabhach, meaning "brindled field".

References

 Coventry, Martin (2001) The Castles of Scotland, 3rd Ed. Scotland: Goblinshead  
Maxwell-Irving, A. M. T. (2000) The Border Towers of Scotland, Creedon Publications

External links
 Picture of the tower at scran.ac.uk

Castles in Dumfries and Galloway